Joshua Ilan Gad (born February 23, 1981) is an American actor. He is known for voicing Olaf in the Frozen franchise, playing Elder Arnold Cunningham in the Broadway musical The Book of Mormon, and playing Le Fou in the live-action adaptation of Disney's Beauty and the Beast. For his role as Olaf, Gad won two Annie Awards, and for his work in The Book of Mormon, he co-won a Grammy Award for Best Musical Theater Album and received a Tony Award nomination for Best Actor in a Musical, both shared with Andrew Rannells as one of the two leading artists.

Gad played Skip Gilchrist in the political sitcom 1600 Penn on NBC, and a fictionalized version of himself on FX's The Comedians, alongside Billy Crystal. His other film roles include The Rocker, The Internship, 21, Love & Other Drugs, Jobs, Pixels, The Wedding Ringer, The Angry Birds Movie and its sequel, A Dog's Purpose and its sequel A Dog's Journey, Marshall, Agatha Christie's Murder on the Orient Express, Little Monsters and Ghostbusters: Afterlife. He has also appeared in ER, The Daily Show, Modern Family, New Girl, Bored to Death, and Numb3rs. In 2020, he began starring in the HBO comedy series Avenue 5.

Early life
Joshua Ilan Gad was born in Hollywood, Florida, on February 23, 1981. His mother, Susan, is a real estate agent and his stepfather is an investment advisor, and he has two older brothers, a stepbrother and a stepsister. His father, Sam (Shmuel) Gad was born to a Jewish family in Afghanistan and moved to Israel as a teenager. Gad believes his father is a descendant of the Tribe of Gad, one of the Twelve Tribes of Israel, further stating that his paternal ancestors traveled through India before settling in Afghanistan. His mother was born in Germany to an Ashkenazi Jewish family of Holocaust survivors. He was raised Jewish.

Gad attended the University School of Nova Southeastern University, graduating in 1999. While there, he won the National Forensics League (NFL) National Tournament Championships for Original Oratory in 1998 and 1999. He also won the 1999 Humorous Interpretation at the National tournament in Phoenix. He then attended the Carnegie Mellon College of Fine Arts, where he graduated in 2003 with a Bachelor of Fine Arts in drama. He attended college with fellow Broadway stars Leslie Odom Jr. and Rory O’Malley, the latter of whom he based his portrayal of Olaf in Frozen on. During this time, he undertook a semester-long exchange at the National Institute of Dramatic Art.

Career

2002–2008: Early career 
Gad made his film debut in the 2002 film Mary and Joe. In 2005, Gad made his television debut by guest-starring in an episode of the NBC medical drama series ER. The same year, he replaced Dan Fogler as William Barfée in The 25th Annual Putnam County Spelling Bee on Broadway after Fogler left the show. Gad went on to star in the Fox sitcom Back to You as news director Ryan Church. The sitcom lasted one season from 2007 to 2008. In 2008, Gad had a supporting role in the drama film 21, and a leading role in the comedy film The Rocker.

2008–2012: The Book of Mormon and minor success on television 
After Back to You, Gad appeared as a correspondent on The Daily Show on May 5, 2009, and became a regular correspondent on June 2, 2009. His signature segments include "The War on Christmas", in which he played an oversexed Benjamin Franklin, and "Chubby Chasers", in which he reported on Michelle Obama's efforts to curb childhood obesity. Gad made his final appearance as a correspondent on June 27, 2011. Also in 2009, Gad starred in the short-form Crackle horror comedy series Woke Up Dead.

In 2010, he had a supporting role in the romantic comedy-drama film Love & Other Drugs opposite Jake Gyllenhaal and Anne Hathaway. That same year, Gad had a voice role in the family comedy film Marmaduke. In 2011, Gad voiced Mondo in the MTV adult animated sitcom Good Vibes. That same year, Gad portrayed Elder Cunningham in the Broadway musical The Book of Mormon. The show opened at the Eugene O'Neill Theatre on March 24, 2011. His last performance was June 6, 2012. Gad was nominated for the 2011 Tony Award for Best Leading Actor in a Musical and won for Grammy Award for Best Musical Theater Album, along with his co-star Andrew Rannells.

In 2012, Gad had a leading role in the independent film She Wants Me. Also in 2012, Gad co-created, produced and starred in the NBC sitcom 1600 Penn. Both Good Vibes and 1600 Penn were canceled after one season. That same year, Gad voiced the molehog Louis in Ice Age: Continental Drift.

2013–2019: Frozen franchise and continued success 
In 2013, he played Andrew in the film The Internship and starred as Steve Wozniak in the film Jobs. The same year, he voiced Olaf in the Disney film Frozen, re-collaborating with co-songwriter Robert Lopez from The Book of Mormon. In 2014, Gad co-starred in Zach Braff's film Wish I Was Here, playing the main character's brother.

In 2015, Gad starred alongside Kevin Hart and Kaley Cuoco in The Wedding Ringer and starred alongside Adam Sandler and Peter Dinklage in Pixels, a film about video game players who are recruited by the military to fight 1980s-era video game characters who have attacked the earth. That same year, Gad co-starred with Billy Crystal on the FX comedy series The Comedians, which premiered on April 9, 2015. The series was canceled after one season. In 2016, Gad voiced Chuck in The Angry Birds Movie, based on the game franchise of the same name.

In 2017, Gad voiced the dog Bailey in A Dog's Purpose, Also that year, he played LeFou in the live-action adaptation of Disney's Beauty and the Beast, directed by Bill Condon and co-starring with Emma Watson. Gad also starred in Reginald Hudlin's biographical drama Marshall, alongside Chadwick Boseman and Beauty and the Beast co-star Dan Stevens, and Gad played Hector MacQueen in a film adaptation of Agatha Christie's detective novel Murder on the Orient Express, directed by and starring Kenneth Branagh, alongside Johnny Depp, Michelle Pfeiffer, Judi Dench, and Daisy Ridley.

In 2019, Gad starred with Lupita Nyong'o and Alexander England in the Hulu horror-comedy Little Monsters. He also starred in A Dog's Journey, the sequel to A Dog's Purpose, reprising his role as Bailey. Also in 2019, Gad reprised his role of Olaf in the sequel Frozen II as well as the video game Kingdom Hearts III.

2020–present: Expanding ventures 
In 2020, Gad returned to television by starring in two different television series. First, Gad starred in the HBO science fiction comedy series Avenue 5 opposite Hugh Laurie. The series premiered on January 19 and was renewed for a second season a month later. Second, Gad created, produced and starred in the Apple TV+ animated musical comedy series Central Park. The series received a two-season order from Apple with each season set to consist of thirteen episodes each. The series premiered on May 29.

He starred in the science fantasy adventure Artemis Fowl (2020), based on the book of the same name by Eoin Colfer. The film was initially set for a theatrical release but was changed to a streaming release on Disney+ due to the coronavirus pandemic. In September 2020 Gad joined Princess Bride Reunion, a virtual live script read-through of the 1987 movie, in the role of Fezzik, originally played by André the Giant. The A.V. Club review singled out his performance as "Josh Gad’s surprisingly moving Andre the Giant tribute... It was an impression in the gentlest, sweetest sense of the word, something remarked on repeatedly by the rest of the cast and host/moderator Patton Oswalt. 10s across the board."

During the COVID-19 pandemic, where people were encouraged to practice social distancing, Gad launched the YouTube series Reunited Apart, which reunites the cast, via video conferencing, of several popular movies and movie series including Back to The Future and Lord of the Rings. The series encourages its viewers to support non-profit charities such as Dig Deep, Project Hope and No Kid Hungry. In June, Gad announced that the episode on Ferris Bueller's Day Off would be the last, though the series later returned for a second season, which premiered in December 2020 with the cast of Wayne's World.

In the runup to the 2020 election, Gad joined other Broadway celebrities with the voter education nonprofit VoteRiders for a virtual party to raise awareness around the complexities of voter ID laws targeting at-risk voters.

Gad is set to serve as co-creator, co-writer, and executive-producer for a Beauty and the Beast prequel limited series for Disney+, in which he will also reprise his role as LeFou as a series regular. Gad was also announced to star as Nick Szalinski in the upcoming film Shrunk, a legacy-sequel to Honey, I Shrunk the Kids.

In January 2019, it was announced Gad was set to produce the live-action remake of Disney's 1996 film The Hunchback of Notre Dame. It was later rumored Gad was considered to play the lead role of Quasimodo; however this was postponed because of COVID-19. Gad was a guest narrator at Disney's Candlelight Processional Dec 10–12, 2022.

Personal life
In 2004, Gad met actress Ida Darvish after the two were cast to play a married couple in the David Ives play All in the Timing. They married in 2008. Gad has stated that while he loves the traditional aspects of Judaism and celebrates some traditions of his wife's Catholicism, he considers himself spiritual but not religious. They have two daughters, Ava Gad, born in 2011, and Isabella Gad, born in 2014. Gad has come out in the past couple years talking about his struggle with Generalized Anxiety Disorder, as part of his effort to combat mental health stigma and shame. As an effort towards squashing the mental health stigma, Gad joined other celebrities in 2018 in an ongoing project through the Child Mind Institute, titled #MyYoungerSelf. This campaign focuses on normalizing mental health especially in kids. The website features Gad and other celebrities talking about their own personal struggles with mental health and how they've found the help they need, while they also encourage viewers to find what can specifically help them. Gad's YouTube series Reunited Apart helped him get through the pandemic and lockdown. While he was out of work for the lockdown, he was able to focus on the series and not let his mental health plummet like many other Americans suffered from during the lockdown period.

Filmography

Film

Television

Video games

Web

Theatre

References

External links

 
 
 
 
 

1981 births
21st-century American comedians
21st-century American male actors
American male film actors
American male musical theatre actors
American male stage actors
American male television actors
American male video game actors
American male voice actors
American people of Afghan-Jewish descent
American people of German-Jewish descent
Annie Award winners
Carnegie Mellon University College of Fine Arts alumni
California Democrats
Disney people
Florida Democrats
Grammy Award winners
Jewish American male actors
Jewish American musicians
Jewish singers
Living people
Male actors from Florida
NSU University School alumni
People from Hollywood, Florida
People of Afghan descent
American Mizrahi Jews
Disney Legends